La Habana Province , formerly known as Ciudad de La Habana Province, is a province of Cuba that includes the territory of the city of Havana, the Republic's capital. Between 1878 and 2010, the name referred to another province that covered a much larger area, which in 2010 was subdivided into the present-day provinces of Artemisa (which also took over three municipalities from Pinar del Río) and Mayabeque.

The province's territory is the seat of the superior organs of the state and its provincial administration.

History
The Province of Havana was created in 1878, is one of the 6 original provinces in which the island was divided, still under Spanish colonial rule. In the political administrative division of 1976, in which the country was divided into 14 provinces, the first Province of Havana was divided into Havana City Province (capital) and Havana Province, with the areas surrounding the capital. The first of them integrated the territories of the metropolitan region of Havana, basically, the old municipalities of Havana, Marianao, Guanabacoa, Regla, Santiago de las Vegas and Santa María del Rosario as well as other adjoining areas.

On August 1, 2010, the National Assembly decided another modification of the territorial organization of Cuba, segmenting the then known as the Province of Havana, colloquially called "Habana Campo" in two new provinces, denominated Artemisa Province, to the west, and Mayabeque Province, to the east, which implied that, as of January 1, 2011 (date of the entry into force of said resolution), there would only be one Cuban province that would be called "from Havana", instead of two; reason why it was also agreed to change the denomination of "Province of Havana City" to that of "Province of Havana", without any need for further additions for, thus, to distinguish or individualize it. In addition, three municipalities of the Pinar del Río Province (Bahía Honda, Candelaria and San Cristóbal) were transferred to the new Province of Artemisa.

Between 1976 and 2010, the provincial administration of the then known as the Province of Havana had its headquarters in the territory of the Havana City Province, since it lacked capital of its own.

It was divided into two new provinces of Artemisa and Mayabeque on January 1, 2011.

Municipalities

Before 1961, Havana was the official name only of the central municipality of a conurbated area that included at least 6 municipalities: Havana, Marianao, Regla, Guanabacoa, Santiago de las Vegas and Santa María del Rosario-Cotorro. Currently, the territory that occupies the old municipality of Havana (former Villa of San Cristóbal de La Habana) is divided into 6 municipalities (Plaza de la Revolución, La Habana Vieja, Centro Habana, Diez de Octubre, Cerro, Arroyo Naranjo), and Boyeros (Altahabana). The city, as it is conceived at the present time, includes all the provincial territory, also includes the territories of 9 municipalities that were not part of old Havana municipality, which are: Playa, Marianao, La Lisa, Guanabacoa, Regla, Habana del Este, San Miguel del Padrón, Cotorro and Boyeros.

Neighborhoods

Source: Oficina Nacional de Estadísticas 2010

See also 
La Habana Province (1976-2010)

References

External links 

 
Provinces of Cuba